The I International Chopin Piano Competition was the inaugural edition of the International Chopin Piano Competition, held from 23 to 30 March 1927 in Warsaw. Soviet pianist Lev Oborin was awarded the first prize.

History 
The competition was initiated by Jerzy Żurawlew, who began seeking funds for a piano competition in 1925, influenced by Aleksander Michałowski. Żurawlew recalled later: "I met with utter incomprehension, indifference and even aversion. The opinion among musicians was unanimous: Chopin is so great that he can defend himself. At the Ministry, it was announced that there were no funds for it [...] and that the whole idea was unfeasible". In this difficult situation, help arrived from Henryk Rewkiewicz—a businessman, music lover and board member of The Warsaw Music Society, who offered his personal financial guarantees to cover the entire deficit expected to arise from the first Competition. Many years later Jerzy Żurawlew wrote, “[…] I was greatly helped by my friend Henryk Rewkiewicz, director of the Match Monopoly, who offered 15,000 złoty - a substantial sum at the time - for the Competition”. Ultimately, things picked up with the election of a new Polish president, Ignacy Mościcki, who became the patron of the Chopin Competition.

The competition was originally scheduled to start on 15 October 1926, the day of the unveiling of Wacław Szymanowski's Chopin Monument in the Łazienki Park, though it was delayed until 1927.

Awards 

26 pianists took part in the competition, including 16 competitors from Poland. After an elimination round, 8 pianists were admitted to the final, where they performed two consecutive movements of one of Chopin's two piano concertos with the Warsaw Philharmonic.

As Żurawlew was convinced that only Polish musicians could truly understand Chopin's music, the jury was composed almost entirely of Poles, Alfred Hoehn of Germany, who judged the finals only, being the sole exception. Throughout the competition, the Polish press only presented Polish competitors as the real contenders for the prize, leading the public to expect a Polish victory. When Lev Oborin was awarded the first prize, it came as a shock and as a national humiliation, the Polish–Soviet War having ended just six years before.

A young Dmitri Shostakovich was among the participants, though he only received an honorable mention.

The following prizes were awarded:

One special prize was awarded:

Jury 
The jury consisted of:
  
  Zbigniew Drzewiecki
  Alfred Hoehn (finals only)
  Witold Maliszewski (chairman)
  Piotr Maszyński
  Henryk Melcer-Szczawiński
  Aleksander Michałowski (first round only)
  
  
  
  
  Józef Turczyński
  Adam Wyleżyński
  Jerzy Żurawlew

References

Further reading

External links 
 
 

 

International Chopin Piano Competition
1927 in music
1927 in Poland
1920s in Warsaw